Alferovskoye is a rural locality (a settlement) in Pelshemskoye Rural Settlement, Sokolsky District, Vologda Oblast, Russia. The population was 11 as of 2002.

Geography 
Alferovskoye is located 34 km southeast of Sokol (the district's administrative centre) by road. Markovskoye is the nearest rural locality.

References 

Rural localities in Sokolsky District, Vologda Oblast